Höja is a small settlement situated in Ängelholm Municipality, Skåne County, Sweden. It had 202 inhabitants in 2010, and lost its locality status in 2015 due to low population numbers.

References 

Populated places in Ängelholm Municipality
Populated places in Skåne County